இலவங்கார்குடி is a village in the Thiruvarur taluk of Tiruvarur district in Tamil Nadu, India. It's in a distance of 3.4 kilometres from Thiruvarur.

Demographics 

As per the 2001 census, Elavangargudi had a population of 4,618 with 2,280 males and 2,338 females. The sex ratio was 1025. The literacy rate was 85.37.

References 

 

Villages in Tiruvarur district